The Star Gauge, or translated as "the armillary sphere chart", is the posthumous title given by Wu Zetian to a 4th-century Chinese poem written by the Sixteen Kingdoms poetess Su Hui to her husband.  It consists of a 29 by 29 grid of characters, which can be read in different ways to form roughly 3,000 smaller rhyming poems.  The outer border forms a single circular poem, thought to be both the first and the longest of its kind.

Description
The Star Gauge consists of 841 characters in a grid.  The original was described by contemporary sources as shuttle-woven on brocade.  It was composed by Su Hui during a time when East Asian Mādhyamaka was one of the predominant philosophical schools in the area.

The outer border is meant to be read in a circle. The grid is known as a palindrome poem, and can be read in different ways to generate over 3,000 shorter poems, in which the second line of every couplet rhymes with that of the next.  The largest set of such poems are 2,848 four-liners with seven characters per line. In the image below, the maroon grid is made up of 32 seven-character phrases. These may be read in certain patterns around the perimeter, and in other patterns for the internal grid. Other poems can be formed by reading characters from the other colored sections.

History of the poem and its retelling 

Early sources focused on the circular poem composing the outer border of the grid, consisting of 112 characters.  Later sources described the whole grid of 840 characters (not counting the central character  , meaning "heart", which lends meaning to the whole but is not part of any of the smaller poems). 
 
The text of the poem was circulated continuously in medieval China and was never lost, but during the Song Dynasty it became scarce. The 112 character version was included in early sources. The earliest surviving excerpts of the entire grid version date from a 10th-century text by Li Fang.

By the Tang period, the following story about the poem was current:

Dou Tao of Qinzhou was exiled to the desert, away from his wife Lady Su. Upon departure from Su, Dou swore that he would not marry another person. However, as soon as he arrived in the desert region, he married someone. Lady Su composed a circular poem, wove it into a piece of brocade, and sent it to him.

Another source, naming the poem as Xuanji Tu (Picture of the Turning Sphere), claims that the grid as a whole was a palindromic poem comprehensible only to Dou (which would explain why none of the Tang sources reprinted it), and that when he read it, he left his desert wife and returned to Su Hui.

Some 13th century copies were attributed to famous women of the Song Dynasty, but falsely so. The poem was also mentioned in the novel Flowers in the Mirror.

See also
Classical Chinese poetry

Notes

References

External links
 A hoverable version of the text at the Star Gauge Poem site

Chinese classic texts
Chinese poetry collections
Poetry anthologies